This is a list of known rulers of Kashmir, in present-day Kashmir region in north of  Indian Subcontinent.

This list starts from the establishment of the Karkota dynasty around 600 CE until the conquest of Kashmir by Mughal Empire in 1586 CE.

Karkota dynasty (c. 600 – 855 CE) 

List of rulers–

Utpala dynasty (c. 855 – 1012 CE) 

List of rulers–

Lohara dynasty (c. 1003 – 1323 CE) 

List of rulers–

Shah Mir dynasty (c. 1339 – 1561 CE) 

List of rulers–

Chak dynasty (c. 1561 – 1589 CE) 

List of rulers–

References 

Kashmir